The Seventh Regiment Armory, also known as Park Avenue Armory, is a historic National Guard armory building located at 643 Park Avenue in the Upper East Side neighborhood of Manhattan, New York City. The building is a brick and stone structure built in 1880 and designed in the Gothic Revival style by Charles Clinton.

The building was made a National Historic Landmark in 1986.

Design 
The building was designed by architect Charles Clinton in the Gothic Revival style and dedicated in 1880.  The builder was R. L. Darragh and bricklayers were Van Dolson & Arnott. It is one of the two remaining armories in the United States to be built and furnished with private funds. It originally served as the headquarters and administrative building for the 7th New York Militia Regiment, known as the Silk Stocking Regiment due to the disproportionate number of its members who were part of the city's social elite.  The building is known for detailed interior rooms that are furnished with ornamental woodwork, marble and stained glass.

The main facade of the administration building faces Park Avenue between 66th & 67th Streets, with the large vaulted space for the drill hall in the center of the block. The administration building has provisions for a reception room, a library, veterans room and staff offices for ten regimental companies. Architects and interior designers of the American Aesthetic Movement were commissioned to furnish the rooms and company quarters. The library is known as the Silver Room or "Trophy Room" and was designed by Louis Comfort Tiffany who worked with architect Stanford White as a consultant on the project. The masterpiece of the armory building is the Veterans Room, also known as the Tiffany Room, with hand carved wood panelling and coffered ceiling in the Viking Revival style.  Other significant craftsmen with work in the building include Kimbel and Cabus, Alexander Roux, Francis Davis Millet, and the Herter Brothers.

Use

Former 
Due to its acoustic properties, the building was used for the historic live broadcast of the radio play The Fall of the City by Archibald MacLeish in 1937. From 1900 until 1963 the venue hosted the U.S. National Indoor Tennis Championships.

Current 
The Armory is currently leased by and home to Park Avenue Armory, a nonprofit arts organization whose mission is to revitalize the landmark as an alternative arts space.

Other organizations using the space include:
 The 53rd Digital Liaison Detachment of the New York Army National Guard, a unit carrying on the heritage of the 7th Regiment.
 The Veterans of the 7th Regiment
 The Veteran Corps of Artillery (VCA), a ceremonial unit which was organized on November 25, 1790 (Evacuation Day) by American Revolutionary War Veterans.
 The Lenox Hill Neighborhood House Women's Mental Health Shelter

Park Avenue Armory has a partnership with Williamsburg High School for Architecture and Design, a 9-12 college preparatory school in Williamsburg, Brooklyn.

See also 
 Champagne Unit
 List of National Historic Landmarks in New York City
 List of armories and arsenals in New York City and surrounding counties
 List of New York City Designated Landmarks in Manhattan from 14th to 59th Streets
 National Register of Historic Places listings in Manhattan from 14th to 59th Streets
 Squadron A Armory

References

External links 

 
 

1880 establishments in New York (state)
Armories in New York City
Armories on the National Register of Historic Places in New York (state)
Gothic Revival architecture in New York City
Government buildings completed in 1880
Historic American Buildings Survey in New York City
Installations of the United States Army National Guard
Military facilities on the National Register of Historic Places in Manhattan
National Historic Landmarks in Manhattan
New York City Designated Landmarks in Manhattan
New York City interior landmarks
Park Avenue